Eduard Charlemont (2 August 1848 – 7 February 1906) was an Austrian painter.

Early life
Eduard Charlemont was born in Vienna, capital of the Austrian Empire, in 1848. His father, Matthias Adolf Charlemont, was also a painter, specializing in painting miniature portraits. His younger brother Hugo Charlemont (1850–1939) was an equally famous impressionist painter. At the age of fifteen Charlemont exhibited his works for the first time at the Academy of Fine Arts Vienna, where he studied fine arts. At the same age Eduard Charlemont was also hired by a girls' school to teach drawing.

Career

After graduating from the Academy of Fine Arts Vienna, Charlemont traveled to many countries in central Europe and finally settled in Paris, where he lived for the next thirty years. In Paris, several times he won the first prize of the Paris Salon, an annual exhibition held by the French Academy of Fine Arts. The most famous work of Charlemont is The Guardian of the Seraglio, widely known as The Moorish Chief, depicting a Moorish swordsman guarding a seraglio (part of a typical wealthy Arabic villa, where women stayed when strangers entered the house). In 1899 he won the gold medal at the Exposition Universelle, a World's Fair held in Paris. Charlemont was also known for his murals. He painted three of the murals of the Burgtheater (the Austrian National Theatre in Vienna and one of the most important German language theatres in the world) totaling a length of about 55 meters. He died in Vienna in 1906.

Today, reproductions of his painting The Moorish Chief are the best-selling items in the museum store of the Philadelphia Museum of Art.

Paintings

The Guardian of the Seraglio (The Moorish Chief), 1878
Arranging her Still Life, 1884
At the toilette
The Music Lesson
Hans Makart in his Atelier
Tunisian Artisan
A Drink for the Drummer, 1889
Artist in his Studio, 1890
A Gentleman in an Interior
Wooden Bridge
Scène d'intérieur
La Parisienne, 1900
Cupid sharpening his arrow

See also
 List of Orientalist artists
 Orientalism

References

Further reading

 Robert Janás: "Strážce harému nebo Maurský náčelník?", In: Mezery v historii/Lücken in der Geschichte, Cheb 2016, pp. 9–13. 
Jennifer A. Thompson, "The Moorish Chief by Eduard Charlemont (cat. 951)" in The John G. Johnson Collection: A History and Selected Works, a Philadelphia Museum of Art free digital publication.

1848 births
1906 deaths
19th-century Austrian painters
Austrian male painters
20th-century Austrian painters
Austrian orientalists
Austrian people of French descent
Artists from Vienna
Academy of Fine Arts Vienna alumni
Orientalist painters
19th-century Austrian male artists
20th-century Austrian male artists